Sons in Law (German: Schwiegersöhne) is a 1926 Austrian silent comedy film directed by Hans Steinhoff and starring Harald Madsen, Carl Schenstrøm and Wilhelm Diegelmann.

Cast
Harald Madsen as Patachon 
Carl Schenstrøm as Pat
Wilhelm Diegelmann 
Oskar Sima 
Marietta Millner 
Vera Voronina 
Gorm Schmidt 
Agnes Petersen-Mozzuchinowa
Gisela Gunther
Hans Jaray
Eugen Neufeld

References

External links

Austrian comedy films
Austrian silent feature films
Films directed by Hans Steinhoff
Austrian black-and-white films
Buddy comedy films
1926 comedy films
Silent comedy films